Paul Owens may refer to:

 Paul Owens (baseball) (1924–2003), American baseball executive and manager
 Paul Owens (dog trainer) (?–), American dog trainer
 Paul Owens (games programmer), English games programmer
 Paul Owens (gospel singer) (1924–2002), American gospel singer
 Paul Owens (rugby league), rugby league footballer for Ireland, and Dudley Hill